National Route 384 is a national highway of Japan on the islands of Fukue and Nakadōri, Nagasaki Prefecture with a total length of 91.7 km (56.98 mi). The highway serves the towns of Gotō and Shin-Kamigotō.

References

384
Roads in Nagasaki Prefecture